Andrew Tanca was an obscure Judge of Logudoro in the mid-eleventh century. He may have reigned alongside his supposed father Barisone I between about 1064/1065 and 1073 or so. He was probably the father (alternatively, uncle or brother) of his probable successor, Marianus I. Little else is known for certain about him, but he was probably a donor to the Abbey of Montecassino.

Sources
Manno, Giuseppe (1835). Storia di Sardegna. P.M. Visaj.

Judges (judikes) of Logudoro
11th-century Italian jurists